The Veterans of Foreign Wars Building in Reno, Nevada, located at 255 VFW Historic Ln, is a historic building that was listed on the U.S. National Register of Historic Places in 2008.
The building was a combined work of VFW Post 207 (founded 1926) and VFW Post 9211 (founded 1944), and includes a "semi-subterranean hall" in Reno's Tighe Park.

The 2012 national convention of the Veterans of Foreign Wars was held in Reno, and U.S. president Barack Obama gave a speech.

References 

National Register of Historic Places in Reno, Nevada
Buildings and structures in Reno, Nevada
Veterans of Foreign Wars buildings
Clubhouses on the National Register of Historic Places in Nevada